Sopronhorpács is a village in Győr-Moson-Sopron County in Hungary.

Sightseeings

Parochial church
 The parochial church of the village was built in the 12th century in Romanesque style. Its beautiful western doorway was built around 1230 together with the southern nave. 
The baroque towers were built in the 18th century.

Széchenyi castle
It was built by the widow of Zsigmond Széchenyi between 1771 and 1774 között. It was rebuilt by Count Ferenc Széchényi, who also extended it with a library. It was later renewed in baroque style. In this castle the famous Hungarian composer Ferenc Liszt pianist played sometimes.

References

 Győr-Moson-Sopron megye kézikönyvéből (Szekszárd, 1998) Torma Margit irásának átdolgozásával.
 Szőnyi O. (É.n.): Régi magyar templomok. Alte Ungarische Kirchen. Anciennes églises Hongroises. Hungarian Churches of Yore. A Műemlékek Országos Bizottsága. Mirályi Magyar Egyetemi Nyomda, Budapest.
 Gerevich Tibor: Magyarország románkori emlékei. (Die romanische Denkmäler Ungarns.) Egyetemi nyomda. Budapest, 1938. 843 p. --- 32-33. p., LXXXVI. tábla bal alsó kép.
 Henszlmann, I. (1876): Magyarország ó-keresztyén, román és átmeneti stylü mű-emlékeinek rövid ismertetése, (Old-Christian, Romanesque and Transitional Style Architecture in Hungary). Királyi Magyar Egyetemi Nyomda, Budapest

External links
 Sopronhorpács official homepage
 Karpatmedence360.hu – Sopronhorpács circular panorama
 Aerial photographs of the castle
 Sopronhorpács on the Vendégváró homepage

Populated places in Győr-Moson-Sopron County
Romanesque architecture in Hungary